is a professional Japanese baseball player. He plays pitcher for the Yomiuri Giants.

References 

1993 births
Living people
Baseball people from Hyōgo Prefecture
Ritsumeikan University alumni
Japanese baseball players
Nippon Professional Baseball pitchers
Yomiuri Giants players